The 1938 Milan–San Remo was the 31st edition of the Milan–San Remo cycle race and was held on 19 March 1938. The race started in Milan and finished in San Remo. The race was won by Giuseppe Olmo of the  team.

General classification

References

Milan–San Remo
Milan–San Remo
Milan–San Remo
Milan–San Remo